Mongoose Publishing is a British manufacturer of role-playing games, miniatures, and card games, publishing material since 2001. Its licenses include products based on the science fiction properties Traveller, Judge Dredd, and Paranoia, as well as fantasy titles.

History 
Mongoose Publishing was founded in Swindon, England, in 2001 by Matthew Sprange and Alex Fennell. Sprange initially wanted to publish a miniatures game, but he ultimately went with the less expensive alternative of using Wizards of the Coast's d20 System license. It grew out of the d20 System boom sparked by Dungeons & Dragons 3rd edition. The first release, the Slayer's Guides, concentrated on different monster types for the d20 system, while the subsequent Quintessential books, detailed specific character classes. The latter was to span three years and thirty-six different titles.

In 2003 the company released the magazine Signs and Portents, a house organ aimed at supplementing and supporting Mongoose's products, as well as a range of generic standalone products based on the d20 System, collectively known as the "OGL series". Further acquisitions followed the same year, including the rights to a roleplaying game based on Conan the Barbarian (released in 2004), the roleplaying game Paranoia and a joint venture with d20 System portal EN World, the EN World Gamer quarterly magazine. Signs & Portents was turned into an online magazine after two years. In 2007, Mongoose added the licenses for new editions of the classic RPGs RuneQuest and Traveller.

In 2008 Mongoose announced that it was ceasing production and marketing of its miniatures ranges and would, for the time being, concentrate solely on the production of RPGs and miniatures rules.

In September 2008, Matthew Sprange announced that Mongoose Publishing had "joined the Rebellion, becoming a sister company to Rebellion itself."

In October 2008, Sprange announced that Mongoose Publishing would be publishing the new Lejendary Adventure line for Gygax Games.

In May 2011, Sprange announced that Mongoose Publishing and Issaries Inc. had parted ways, meaning that Mongoose would cease publication of RuneQuest, though they retain the copyrights to the revised RuneQuest II core rule system, which was re-released under the title Legend.

Games and products

Miniature Games 
 Noble Armada: A Call to Arms
 Babylon 5: A Call to Arms
 Judge Dredd: Gangs of Mega-City One
 Starship Troopers: The Miniatures Game
 Mighty Armies
 Battlefield Evolution
 Victory at Sea
 A Call to Arms: Star Fleet (A partnership with Amarillo Design Bureau, based on the Star Fleet Universe)

Role-playing games and supplements 
 The Extraordinary Adventures of Baron Munchausen
 Armageddon: 2089
 Babylon 5 Roleplaying Game
 Cities of Fantasy series
Skraag: City of Orcs
 Stormhaven: City of a Thousand Seas
 Highthrone: City of the Clouds
 Stonebridge: City of Illusions
 Classic Play series
 Conan: The Roleplaying Game - translated into Spanish by the Spanish publishing house Edge Entertainment in 2005, into French by UbIK in 2007, and in Italian by Stratelibri/Wyrd Edizioni in 2006
 CthulhuTech
 Elric of Melnibone
 Encyclopedia Arcane series
 Infernum
 Jeremiah: The Roleplaying Game (based on the TV series)
 The Judge Dredd Roleplaying Game
 Lone Wolf: The Roleplaying Game and the Lone Wolf Multiplayer Game Book
 Macho Women with Guns
 Noctum
 OGL Ancients
 OGL CyberNet
 OGL Horror
 OGL Steampunk
 OGL Wild West
 Paranoia
 Power Classes series
 Quintessential series
 RuneQuest
 Sláine: The Roleplaying Game of Celtic Heroes (based on the comics)
 Slayers Guide series
 Stars Without Number
 Starship Troopers: The Roleplaying Game
 Traveller
 Travellers' Tales series
 Ultimate series
 Wars RPG

Periodicals 
 Signs & Portents
 EN World Gamer

References

External links
 

Board game publishing companies
Card game publishing companies
Role-playing game publishing companies
Rebellion Developments